Smith Peak, in Yosemite National Park in the United States, overlooks the Hetch Hetchy Reservoir and provides grand vistas of the Hetch Hetchy Valley and surrounding wilderness. It is named for a sheep owner who claimed to own the Hetch Hetchy Valley and used it as a summer pasture.

References

External links
 

Mountains of Yosemite National Park
Mountains of Tuolumne County, California
Mountains of Northern California